Mia Arbatova (4 March 1911 – 1990) was an Israeli ballet dancer and teacher.  In Israel, she was one of the leading pioneers of classical ballet.

Life
Arbatova was born in the Russian Empire in 1911. She was one of three daughters of chemist Ze’ev Hirschwald and Zila Schmulian-Hirschwald. Her father died when she was five.

Arbatova danced as the soloist in the Riga Opera Ballet for several years before she relocated to Palestine in 1938.  Arbatova opened her own first ballet studio in a laundry in 1943 in Tel Aviv.  Arbatova was honored by the Municipality of Tel Aviv-Yafo in 1985 with awarding her the title of Honorary Citizen of Tel Aviv for her contributions and continued efforts to the art of dance.

In 1989 Nira Paaz founded a ballet school in Arbatova's name. Arbatova died the 
following year, donating her body to science.

Gallery

References   

Israeli ballerinas
Soviet emigrants to Mandatory Palestine
Israeli people of Russian-Jewish descent
Ballet teachers
1911 births
1990 deaths
Burials at Yarkon Cemetery